Todelovskaya is a rural locality (a village) in Nizhneslobodskoye Rural Settlement, Vozhegodsky District, Vologda Oblast, Russia. The population was 18 as of 2002.

Geography 
Todelovskaya is located 51 km east of Vozhega (the district's administrative centre) by road. Klimovskaya is the nearest rural locality.

References 

Rural localities in Vozhegodsky District